The discography of Sharon Jones & the Dap Kings consists of seven studio albums, three compilation albums, and the soundtrack album of Miss Sharon Jones!, in addition to more than thirty album and non-album singles. Not included in these numbers are the singles released by the band in the late 1990s as the Soul Providers.

Albums

Studio albums

Compilation albums

Singles 
Adapted from the Daptone catalog.

As primary artist

As remixed artist

Collections 

 I Learned The Hard Way – 45s Box Set
Dappy Holidays – 45s Box Set

Guest appearances

Soundtrack appearances 

 Good Luck Chuck (Motion Picture Soundtrack) (2007) – "You're Gonna Get It"
 Soul Men (Original Motion Picture Soundtrack) (2008) – "Just Dropped In (To See What Condition My Condition Was In)"
Up In The Air (Music From The Motion Picture) (2009) – "This Land Is Your Land" 
 Hung: Original Television Soundtrack (2010) – "How Long Do I Have to Wait for You?"
For Colored Girls: Music From and Inspired by the Original Motion Picture Soundtrack (2010) – "Longer & Stronger"
 Stand Up Guys (Original Motion Picture Soundtrack) (2012) – "Give It Back"
The Wolf Of Wall Street: Music From The Motion Picture (2013) – "Goldfinger"
Maron (Music From The Original Television Series) (2013) – "Give Me A Chance"
Luke Cage OST (2016) – "100 Day, 100 Nights"

Dap-Kings credits

Singles 
Adapted from the Daptone catalog.

Guest appearances

References 

Soul music discographies
Discographies of American artists
Funk music discographies